USS Hingham (PF-30), a  frigate, was the only ship of the United States Navy to be named for Hingham, Massachusetts.  Hingham, originally designated PG-138, was launched under Maritime Commission contract by Walter Butler Shipbuilding Company in Superior, Wisconsin, on 27 August 1943, sponsored by Mrs. Katherine F. Harrington; and commissioned on 3 November 1944 after outfitting at Plaquemine, Louisiana.  Her first commanding officer was Lieutenant Commander W. K. Earle, USCG.

Following shakedown training out of Bermuda, Hingham finished conversion to a weather ship at Boston, Massachusetts, and after escorting a merchant ship from NS Argentia, Newfoundland, to Boston reported on 3 January 1945 to the North Atlantic Weather Patrol.  The ship then took up the arduous duties of weather patrol in the North Atlantic during winter, performing the task of reporting so vital to convoying and warship movements alike.  She remained on station after the close of World War II, returning to Boston on 4 May 1946.

Hingham then sailed to Charleston, South Carolina, where she was decommissioned on 5 June 1946.  The frigate was sold on 15 August 1947 to Sun Shipbuilding & Dry Dock Company of Chester, Pennsylvania, and scrapped.

References

External links  
      history.navy.mil: USS Hingham
   navsource.org: USS Hingham
       hazegray.org: USS Hingham

Tacoma-class frigates
World War II patrol vessels of the United States
Ships built in Superior, Wisconsin
1943 ships
Weather ships